Codan Medical is a privately owned manufacturer of medical equipment based in Rødby, Lolland Municipality, Denmark.

History
CODAN Medical was founded in 1939 by Sven Husted-Andersen. It was later passed on to his son, Stig Husted-Andersen, who died in 2008. The company is now owned by his three daughters, Deirdre, Alexandra and Stefanie Husted-Andersen.

References

External links
 Official website
 Codan Medical

Medical technology companies of Denmark
Health care companies of Denmark
Danish companies established in 1930
Companies based in Lolland Municipality